Weissella uvarum  is a bacterium from the genus of Weissella which has been isolated from wine grapes from Nemea in Greece.

References

 

Bacteria described in 2014
Weissella